Dejan Kekezović (Serbian Cyrillic: Дејан Кекезовић; born 6 June 1982) is a Serbian professional footballer who plays as a midfielder.

Club career
Kekezović started out at Radnički Bajmok, before joining Spartak Subotica. He subsequently made his top flight debut in 1999, aged 17. In the 2002 winter transfer window, Kekezović moved to Sartid Smederevo. He spent the following four and a half years at the club, winning the Serbia and Montenegro Cup in 2003. After leaving Smederevo in the summer of 2006, Kekezović returned to his parent club Radnički Bajmok.

In the summer of 2008, Kekezović signed with Serbian SuperLiga club Hajduk Kula. He eventually switched to Bačka Topola in the 2012 winter transfer window. Kekezović spent three and a half years with the club, before leaving in the summer of 2015.

International career
Kekezović represented FR Yugoslavia at the 2001 UEFA European Under-18 Championship. He also made one appearance for the FR Yugoslavia U21s during the 2004 UEFA European Under-21 Championship qualification, scoring a goal in a 3–3 draw with Finland.

Kekezović also played for the national team of Croatian national minority in Serbia.

Statistics

Honours
Sartid Smederevo
 Serbia and Montenegro Cup: 2002–03

References

External links
 
 

Association football midfielders
First League of Serbia and Montenegro players
FK TSC Bačka Topola players
FK Hajduk Kula players
FK Smederevo players
FK Spartak Subotica players
Serbia and Montenegro under-21 international footballers
Serbian footballers
Serbian SuperLiga players
Sportspeople from Subotica
1982 births
Living people
Croats of Vojvodina